Nining Meida is an Indonesian pop singer who became popular in 1980s by singing the whole song in Sundanese-language. Her most famous album was Kalangkang (1986).

Career
Meida started singing at the age of 13 and has produced dozens of albums.

In 1986 Kalangkang was released. This album has sold more than 1 million copies.

Her popular songs include Kalangkang, which became a huge hit and is considered an archetype of Sundanese pop, and Situ Patenggang.

Meida also founded Promina Records in Bandung.

References

Living people
20th-century Indonesian women singers
Sundanese people
1965 births